Nur-e Eyn (also Romanized as Nūr-e ‘Eyn, Nūr ‘Eyn, Nūr‘ain, and Nūrīn) is a village in Shamsabad Rural District, in the Central District of Arak County, Markazi Province, Iran. At the 2006 census, its population was 107, in 32 families.

References 

Populated places in Arak County